imdb Calene-Black  is an American voice actress who has provided voices for a number of English language versions of Japanese anime films and television series. She has worked for Funimation, ADV Films and Sentai Filmworks. Some of her leading voice roles include Mireille in Noir, Kyou Fujibayashi in Clannad, Medaka Kurokami in Medaka Box, Hamyuts Meseta in The Book of Bantorra and Hime in Princess Resurrection. In live action films, she played the lead role of Maria Patterson in the Mariusz Kotowski-directed Holocaust film Esther's Diary.

Biography
Calene-Black was born and raised in Texas. She studied theatre at the University of Houston and worked on stage in New York City. After returning to Houston, she worked on local theatre groups such as the Alley Theatre and Stages Repertory Theatre.

Filmography

Anime

Film

Live action

References

External links
 
 

Living people
American voice actresses
Actresses from Fort Worth, Texas
Actresses from Houston
21st-century American actresses
American film actresses
American television actresses
20th-century American actresses
Year of birth missing (living people)